

2022 estimates
List of countries in Asia-Pacific by GDP (nominal), International Monetary Fund (Estimates for October 2022).

No Data

  (US)
  (UK)
  (Australia)
  (Australia)
  (New Zealand)
  (France)
  (US)
  (France)
  (New Zealand)
  (Australia)
  (US)
 
  (UK)
  (New Zealand)
  (France)

See also
List of Asian countries by GDP (PPP)
List of Arab League countries by GDP (nominal)

Notes and references

GDP with nominal
Asian and Pacific with nominal
GDP with nominal
GDP with nominal
Nominal GDP with Asia